Winnowing is an agricultural method for separating grain from chaff.

Winnowing may also refer to:

 Winnowing (sedimentology), a natural sediment separation process
 Winnowing (snipe) or drumming, a courtship sound
 "The Winnowing", a 1976 short story by Isaac Asimov